HHY may refer to:

 Highbury & Islington station, in London
 Hoia Hoia language, spoken in Papua New Guinea
 "Hare Hare Yukai", a song; see List of Haruhi Suzumiya albums